Alexander Onischuk (born September 3, 1975) is a Ukrainian-American chess player. He was awarded the title of Grandmaster by FIDE in 1994, and won the 2006 U.S. championship.

Career
In 1991 Onischuk finished second in the world under 16 championship and in 1993 he was fourth in the world junior championship, tying for first and finished second on tie-breaks two years later. In 2000 he won the Ukrainian Championship. He represented Ukraine in the Chess Olympiad in 1994, 1996 and 1998.

Onischuk immigrated to the United States in 2001. He competed in the US Championship, winning the tournament in 2006, finishing 2nd in 2007, 2008 and 2017 and finishing 3rd four more times.

He played in the FIDE World Chess Championship in 2000 and 2004, and in the FIDE World Cup every year between 2007 and 2017. He also represented the US in six Chess Olympiads and seven World Team Chess Championships.

In the fall of 2012, Onischuk became the head coach at Texas Tech University. Under his coaching, the Texas Tech University Chess Program has won the 2015-2016 and 2019-2020 Pan-American Intercollegiate Team Chess Championships and played in the President's cup 5 times.

In 2018 he was inducted into the US Chess Hall of Fame.

References

External links

 
 
 
 
 
 
  

1975 births
Living people
American chess players
Chess grandmasters
Chess Olympiad competitors
People from Baltimore
Sportspeople from Sevastopol
Soviet chess players
Ukrainian chess players
Ukrainian emigrants to the United States